Joseph Beck or Joe Beck may refer to:

 Joseph Beck (baritone) (1848–1903), Austrian operatic baritone 
 Joseph D. Beck (1866–1936), United States congressman from Wisconsin
 Joseph M. Beck, justice of the Iowa Supreme Court, 1868–1891
 Joe Beck (1945–2008), American guitarist
 Józef Beck (1894–1944), Polish foreign minister
 József Beck (born 1952), Hungarian mathematician